The Aircraft Stores Compatibility Engineering Squadron (ASCENG SQN) was the Australian Defence Force design authority for aircraft/stores compatibility and air weapons engineering.

It was located at RAAF Base Edinburgh in Adelaide, South Australia.

In 2016, the squadron was amalgamated with the Aircraft Systems Engineering Squadron, to form the Air Warfare Engineering Squadron.

References

 "Into the future", Air Force News 

RAAF squadrons